Yellow Bank, Yellow Banks, or Yellowbanks may refer to:

Yellow Bank, Brasil
Yellow Bank, Indiana
Yellow Bank Township, Minnesota
Yellow Bank River in Minnesota and South Dakota
Yellow Banks, Kentucky
Yellowbanks, Indiana, an unincorporated community
Yellowbanks, the James Alfred Roosevelt Estate, in New York
Yellowbanks, Indiana- an unincorporated community and campground/recreational center